Kjersti Stenseng (born 4 September 1974) is a Norwegian politician for the Labour Party.

She finished her secondary education at Vinstra Upper Secondary School in 1993. She minored in sociology and modern history at the Nord-Trøndelag University College and Lillehammer University College before studying political science and history at the University of Oslo. She also took teacher's education and worked as a teacher in Kvam and Vinstra from 1997 to 1999. From 1999 to 2010 she worked in the Peer Gynt Festival, the last nine years as director, and from 2010 to 2011 she was the director of the Norwegian Festival of Literature.

She served as a municipal council member in Sør-Fron from 2007 to 2011. She became leader in Oppland Labour Party in 2010 and also national board member, and was promoted to central board member in 2011. She was an acting political adviser in the Ministry of Culture from January to August 2010, then acting political adviser again from June to October 2011. From November to December 2011 she was an acting State Secretary in the same ministry. From 1 January 2012 she was an acting political adviser again, then political adviser from March and State Secretary from May 2012 to 1 October 2013.

She was elected as a deputy representative to the Parliament of Norway from Oppland in 2013. As Rigmor Aasrud from Oppland was a member of the outgoing Stoltenberg's Second Cabinet, Stenseng met as a regular representative during the two weeks before the cabinet change.

References

1974 births
Living people
People from Nord-Fron
University of Oslo alumni
Norwegian schoolteachers
Oppland politicians
Labour Party (Norway) politicians
Norwegian state secretaries
Members of the Storting
Women members of the Storting
Norwegian women state secretaries